The Stele of Davati is a cross-shaped limestone stele, carrying a bas-relief, depicting Virgin Mary alongside the archangels Michael and Gabriel, with one of the earliest inscriptions in Georgian Asomtavruli script. The upper part of the stele that is assumed to have been depiction of the Feast of the Ascension is broken and lost. It has been dated from the 4th to the 5th century. The stele was discovered in 1985 in a small Church of the Virgin in highland village of Davati, Dusheti Municipality.

Hypothesis
The Georgian scholar Ramin Ramishvili conjectures that the combination of letters ႩႲႽ corresponds to the number 5320 (5000 + 300 + 20, correspondingly Ⴉ [k] + Ⴒ [t] + Ⴝ [č]), which may denote, according to Georgian numerals, the year 284 BC, the alleged date of creation of the first Georgian script.

See also 
Stele of Serapeitis
Stele of Vespasian

References

Bibliography 
Machabeli, K. (2008) Early Medieval Georgian Stone Crosses, Ministry of Culture and Sports of Georgia, Chubinashvili National Research Centre for History of Georgian Art and Monument Protection,

External links
History of Georgia through Artifacts: Stele of Davati on Georgian Public Broadcasting 

Davati
Georgian inscriptions
Archaeological artifacts
5th-century inscriptions
1985 archaeological discoveries